Vardja may refer to several places in Estonia:

Vardja, Harju County, village in Kose Parish, Harju County
Vardja, Põlva County, village in Põlva Parish, Põlva County
Vardja, Viljandi County, village in Viljandi Parish, Viljandi County